Montivilliers ( or ) is a commune in the Seine-Maritime department in the Normandy region in northern France.

Geography

History
Pre-Roman archaeological discoveries include Bronze Age axes and jade jewelry. The old Roman road from here to Harfleur was destroyed by the English in 1415. The Abbey Church of Notre-Dame, sometimes referred to as the Montivilliers Abbey dates back to 684, although it was destroyed by a Viking raid in 850, and rebuilt as a church in both the Romanesque and Gothic styles.

Heraldry

Population

Places of interest
 The nineteenth-century chateau de Colmoulins.
 The church of St. Germain, dating from the fourteenth century.
 The abbey church of Notre-Dame, dating from the eleventh century.
 The abbey museum
 A Protestant church (1787)
 The medieval ramparts.
 The Arboretum du parc de Rouelles is an arboretum set within the Parc de Rouelles.

People 
 Isaac de Larrey (1639–1719), French historian was born in Montvilliers
 René Bihel, French footballer was born here in 1916.
 Arthur Good (1853–1928), French engineer, science educator, author, and caricaturist who wrote under the pen-name "Tom Tit".
 Sébastien Lepape, short track speed skater, born here in 1991.
 Lys Mousset, professional footballer for VfL Bochum
 Édouard Mendy, professional footballer for Chelsea F.C.
 Jean Prévost, writer, lived here when his father was principal of a local school.

Twin towns
 Nordhorn, Germany since 1963

See also
Communes of the Seine-Maritime department

References

External links

 Montivilliers official website 
 Montivilliers Abbey official website 
 Articleand photos  about the abbey at Montivilliers 
 Abbey Church of Notre-Dame 

Communes of Seine-Maritime